Mum is Pouring Rain  is a French animated short film produced by Laïdak Films written by Hugo de Faucompret and Lison d'Andréa and directed by Hugo de Faucompret. Released in  2021, it won the Jury Prize in the Special TV category at the Annecy international animated film festival the same year. The film was shortlisted for the Academy Award for Best Animated Short Film for the 94th Academy Awards.

Plot 
Jane is looking forward to spending Christmas with her Mom who is battling a depression, so she is sent unknowingly to her Grandma's instead. The holidays turn out to be quite an adventure as Jane meets new friends: Cloclo, the gigantic hobo who lives in the forest, and Sonia and Leon, two local kids. As she learns to open herself to others, Jane will inspire her mother the necessary strength to get back on her feet.

Production 
The film, commissioned by Canal+, is created by Hugo de Faucompret and co-written with Lison d'Andréa. The graphic design and the storyboard are executed by Hugo de Faucompret. The backgrounds of this 29-minutes-film were all hand-painted with gouache, and the 2D animation was digitally made on TVPaint with pencil-scratched lines feeling. In 2022, the film is getting two sequels in order to combine a trilogy as a feature-length work.

Accolades 
Since its launch, the film has been selected in various festivals and academies around the world, including: 

The short was part of the world touring screening The Animation Showcase 2021.

Voice cast 
 Yolande Moreau as Mémé Oignon
 Céline Sallette as Cécile
 Arthur H as Cloclo
 Siam Georget Rolland as  Jeanne

References

External links 
 Maman pleut des cordes sur le site du festival d'Annecy
Maman pleut des cordes sur le site de Unifrance
Mum is Pouring Rain

2021 films
French animated short films
2021 animated films
2021 short films
French animated films
French children's adventure films
Films about depression
2020s French films